Seounsan  is a mountain in South Korea. Its area extends across the city of Anseong, Gyeonggi-do and Jincheon County, Chungcheongbuk-do. Seounsan translates as "West Clouds Mountain". The Cheongryongsa or "Blue Dragon Temple" is located on the Southern slope of the mountain.

See also
 List of mountains in Korea

Notes

References
 

Mountains of South Korea
Mountains of Gyeonggi Province
Mountains of North Chungcheong Province